Thailand participated in the 1982 Asian Games in Delhi on 19 November to 4 December 1982. Thailand ended the games at 10 overall medals including only 1 gold medal.

References

Nations at the 1982 Asian Games
1982
Asian Games